This is a complete list of the judgments given by the Supreme Court of the United Kingdom between the court's opening on 1 October 2009 and the end of that year. Most of the cases were heard in the House of Lords before judgments were given in the new Supreme Court.  The court heard 17 cases during this time; they are listed in order of each case's Neutral citation number.

The table lists judgments made by the court and the opinions of the judges in each case. Judges are treated as having concurred in another's judgment when they either formally attach themselves to the judgment of another or speak only to acknowledge their concurrence with one or more judges. Any judgment which reaches a conclusion which differs from the majority on one or more major points of the appeal has been treated as dissent.

Because every judge in the court is entitled to hand down a judgment, it is not uncommon for groups of judges to reach the same conclusion (i.e. whether to allow or dismiss the appeal) in materially different ways, for example if a panel of 9 judges heard a case with 4 judges dismissing the appeal, 3 finding for the appellant on one point and 2 on another - the table should show 5 judges as the majority and the 4 judges who actually held the more mainstream view as dissenting. The table also does not reflect how significantly judges differed, or how much of a contribution a particular judge made to the overall judgment.

Table key

2009 Judgments

Notes

Judges

Lord Saville was unavailable for much of the year due to the ongoing Bloody Sunday Inquiry which he was chairing.
Lord Scott is a former Lord of Appeal in Ordinary. He did not formally accept a position in the reformed Supreme Court but was invited to take part in several cases. If Scott had accepted the position, his mandatory retirement would have been 2 October 2009 - the day after the Court officially opened.
Lord Judge is the Lord Chief Justice and not a Justice of the Supreme Court, he sat in one case in his capacity as a senior judge.
Lord Neuberger is the Master of the Rolls and not an official member of the Supreme Court. As a senior judge he is entitled to sit in cases at the court's discretion.
The other members of the court are listed in order of seniority. Lord Phillips of Worth Matravers and Lord Hope were respectively the President and Deputy throughout all of the cases in 2009.

References

External links
 Supreme Court decided cases, 2009

Supreme Court of the United Kingdom cases
Judgments of the Supreme Court of the United Kingdom
Supreme Court of the United Kingdom